Karen Tan Puay Kiow (born 1962) was the first woman to reach the rank of colonel in the Singapore Armed Forces. In 2014 she was inducted into the Singapore Women's Hall of Fame .

Tan is married and has two sons. She retired from the army in 2007 and became general manager of ST Electronics.

References

1962 births
Living people
Singaporean colonels
Women soldiers